Armenian declaration of independence may refer to:
Declaration of Independence of Armenia (1918)
Declaration of State Sovereignty of Armenia, 1990